John Thomas Greene Jr. (November 28, 1929 – February 11, 2011) was a United States district judge of the United States District Court for the District of Utah.

Education and career

Born in Salt Lake City, Utah, Greene received a Bachelor of Arts degree from the University of Utah in 1952 and a Juris Doctor from the University of Utah College of Law in 1955. He was in private practice in Salt Lake City for much of the period from 1955 to 1985, and. He was an Assistant United States Attorney for the District of Utah from 1957 to 1959, and was a special assistant state attorney general of Utah from 1960 to 1965. He was elected Utah State Bar President in 1970. He was also active in the American Bar Association, where he served for 17 years in the House of Delegates, as a Delegate at Large, as the designated Utah State Bar Delegate, and finally as a member of the ABA Board of Governors. He was chairman of the Utah State Building Authority in 1980, and a member of the Utah Board of Higher Education from 1983 to 1986.

Federal judicial service

On March 7, 1985, Greene was nominated by President Ronald Reagan to a new seat on the United States District Court for the District of Utah created by 98 Stat. 333. He was confirmed by the United States Senate on April 3, 1985, and received his commission on April 4, 1985. Greene assumed senior status on November 28, 1997. He died on February 11, 2011.

Personal

Thomas was a member of Phi Beta Kappa, Pi Kappa Alpha, and Owl and Key at University of Utah.

References

Sources
 
 Salt Lake Tribute Obituary

1929 births
2011 deaths
University of Utah alumni
S.J. Quinney College of Law alumni
Judges of the United States District Court for the District of Utah
United States district court judges appointed by Ronald Reagan
20th-century American judges
Assistant United States Attorneys